The Football Association of Thailand under Patronage of His Majesty the King, or FA Thailand for short, is the governing body of association football, futsal and beach soccer in Thailand. It was founded on 25 April 1916. The association joined FIFA on 23 June 1925 and AFC in 1954.

History

In 1916, King Vajiravudh founded "The Football Association of Thailand under Patronage of His Majesty the King" after that the association joined the FIFA in 1925 and AFC in 1954.

Thailand national football team joined Olympic Games first time in Australia in 1956.

The first football stadium, Supachalasai Stadium, was built in 1935. King's Cup, the first football cup was introduced in 1968. And then two years later, Queen's Cup, a national cup competition, started in 1970.

Thai football competitions

Leagues and tournaments
League competitions in Thailand include : 

 Thai League 1
 Thai League 2
 Thai League 3
 Thailand Semi-Pro League
 Thailand Amateur League

(See also: Thai football league system for the additional detail about league system.)

Cup competitions
 Thai FA Cup – an annual match of football clubs in Thailand.
 Thai League Cup – an annual match of football clubs in Thailand.
 Thailand Champions Cup –  an annual match between the champions Thai League 1 and the champions Thai FA Cup or runners-up of the Thai League 1.
 King's Cup – an annual international football competition for national teams.
 Queen's Cup – an annual national football cup competition.

List of FAT Presidents
The following is a list of presidents of Football Association of Thailand (FAT).

Association staff

See also
 Football in Thailand
 Football records in Thailand
 Thailand national football team
 Thailand women's national football team
 Thailand national futsal team
 Thailand women's national futsal team
 Thailand national beach soccer team
 Thai League 1

References

External links

  of the Football Association of Thailand website 
 Football Association of Thailand at AFC site
 Thailand at FIFA site

Football in Thailand
1916 establishments in Siam
Thailand
Sports governing bodies in Thailand
Sports organizations established in 1916
Organizations based in Thailand under royal patronage